Fudbalski klub Jedinstvo Brodac (Serbian Cyrillic: Фудбалски клуб Јединство Бpoдaц) is a football club based in Brodac, near Bijeljina, Republika Srpska, Bosnia and Herzegovina.

In July 2021 they celebrated 90 years of existence. The club has been competing in the Second League of the Republika Srpska group East since 2005.

Club seasons
Source:

References

External sources
 FK Jedinstvo Brodac at FSRS

Football clubs in Bosnia and Herzegovina
Football clubs in Republika Srpska
Bijeljina
Association football clubs established in 1931